Mahtotopa Mountain is located in the Lewis Range, Glacier National Park in the U.S. state of Montana. Mahtotopa Mountain rises to the south above Saint Mary Lake midway between Red Eagle Mountain and Little Chief Mountain and can be easily seen from the Going-to-the-Sun Road to the southwest of Rising Sun. Originally named Four Bears Mountain by George Bird Grinnell in 1885, the name was changed in 1932 to Mahtotopa. Mahtotopa is an incorrect spelling of "Mato-tope", the Mandan chief known as Four Bears. Mato-tope was a grandfather of Joe Kipp, a hunting companion of Grinnell.

Climate
Based on the Köppen climate classification, Mahtotopa Mountain is located in a subarctic climate zone characterized by long, usually very cold winters, and short, cool to mild summers. Winter temperatures can drop below −10 °F with wind chill factors below −30 °F.

Geology
Like other mountains in Glacier National Park, Mahtotopa Mountain is composed of sedimentary rock laid down during the Precambrian to Jurassic periods.

Gallery

See also
 List of mountains and mountain ranges of Glacier National Park (U.S.)

References

Mountains of Glacier County, Montana
Mountains of Glacier National Park (U.S.)
Lewis Range